AZON (or Azon), from "azimuth only", was one of the world's first guided weapons, deployed by the Allies and contemporary with the German Fritz X.

Officially designated VB-1 ("Vertical Bomb 1"), it was invented by Major Henry J. Rand and Thomas J. O'Donnell during the latter stages of World War II as the answer to the difficult problem of destroying the narrow wooden bridges that supported much of the Burma Railway.

AZON was essentially a  general-purpose AN-M65 bomb with a quadrilateral 4-fin style radio controlled tail fin design as part of a "tail package" to give the desired guidance capability, allowing adjustment of the vertical trajectory in the yaw axis, giving the Azon unit a lateral steering capability (meaning it could only steer left and right, and could not alter its pitch or rate of fall). This lack of any pitch control meant that the bombardier still had to accurately release it with a bombsight to ensure it could not fall short of or beyond the target. The "tail package" bolted onto the standard bomb warhead, in place of the usual sheet-metal fixed fins; this concept was an early iteration of a now common method of making modern guided bombs (such as the JDAM, the Paveway family, the KAB-500L, etc.): making the guidance and control units as separate pieces that attach to the tail and/or nose of a standard "iron bomb", making it into a guided weapon. There were gyroscopes mounted in the bomb's added tail package that made it an Azon unit, to autonomously stabilize it in the roll axis via operating a pair of ailerons, and a radio control system to operate the proportional-control rudders, to directly control the bomb's direction of lateral aim, with the antennas for the tail-mounted receiver unit built into the diagonal support struts of the tail surface assembly. The bomb's receiver and control system were powered by a battery which had around three minutes of battery life. The entire setup in the added "tail package" was sufficient to guide the weapon from a 5,000-foot (1,500 m) drop height to the target. Situated on the tail of the bomb was a 600,000-candela flare which also left behind a noticeable smoke trail, to enable the bombardier to observe and control it from the control aircraft. When used in combat, it was dropped from a modified Consolidated B-24 Liberator, with earlier development test drops of the Azon in the United States sometimes using the B-17 Flying Fortress as the platform. Some ten crews, of the 458th Bombardment Group, based at RAF Horsham St Faith, were trained to drop the device for use in the European theater.

The ability to only control the path of the bomb in the azimuth direction, made AZON bombs most suitable for long and narrow targets, such as bridges or railways. A disadvantage of using an AZON bomb was that after a bomb was dropped the bomber could not break way immediately because the bombardier had to keep the bomb in view so he could guide it. The bombardier used a BC-1156 joystick control to adjust the course left or right. The directional commands were sent to the guidance package via a special-purpose radio system.

The 493rd Bomb Squadron also dropped Azon bombs in Burma in early 1945 from similarly-modified B-24s, based at Pandaveswar Airfield, India, with considerable success, fulfilling the designers' original purpose for the ordnance.

Azon operations

See also
 Bat (U.S. Navy autonomously radar-guided bomb)
 Fritz X
 GB-8
 Kehl-Strasbourg radio control link, for MCLOS control of WW II German PGM ordnance
 List of anti-ship missiles

References

External links

NMUSAF page about the Azon ordnance
Official 1943 USAAF film describing the AZON bomb
USAAF and USN guided air-to-surface ordnance of World War II
The Dawn of the Smart Bomb
Guided weapons of World War II
GB series weapons
Account of AZON Bomb Use by the 458th Bomb Group in ETO
Account of AZON Bomb Use by the 493rd Bomb Squadron in CBI Theater
Video account of AZON Use Against the Burma Railway bridges
WW II video of AZON Bomb Drop over Burma
Another video of AZONs in action over Burma

World War II weapons of the United States
World War II aerial bombs of the United States
Guided bombs of the United States
Weapons and ammunition introduced in 1944